This is a list of the results of the 2021 Scottish Parliament election.

National results

Results by region

Summary

Central Scotland

Glasgow

Highlands and Islands

Lothian

Mid Scotland and Fife

North East Scotland

South Scotland

West Scotland

Results by constituency

References 
 
 

 
 Results by region
 Central Scotland
 Glasgow
 Highlands and Islands
 Lothian
 Mid Scotland and Fife
 North East Scotland
 South Scotland
 West Scotland

General elections to the Scottish Parliament